Ian McFarland may refer to:

Ian A. McFarland, theologian
Ian McFarland (musician), bassist and director